The 1928 Cardiff City Council election was held on Monday 1 November 1928 to elect councillors to Cardiff City Council in Cardiff, Glamorgan, Wales. It took place on the same day as many other local elections in Wales and England.

This was the tenth annual all-Cardiff elections since the 1914-18 Great War. The previous elections were in November 1927 and the next annual all-Cardiff elections were to take place in November 1929.

Background
Cardiff County Borough Council had been created in 1889. Cardiff became a city in 1905. The council consisted of 39 councillors who were elected by the town's voters and thirteen aldermen who were elected by the councillors. Elections to the local authority were held annually, though not all council seats were included in each contest, because the four councillors in each ward stood down for election in three-yearly rotation.

Thirteen seats were up for election in November 1928. One Labour held seat was uncontested. Labour ran candidates in all 13 wards. There were eight Conservative candidates,  six Liberals, 2 Independents and one Communist.

Overview of the result
Turnout was 61.0%, up on 1927 (42.4%) and 1925 (56.4%). Labour won seven seats, Conservatives three, Liberals two and Independents one.

Council composition
Following the November 1927 election the balance on the city council was 18 Liberal, 18 Conservative, 13 Labour and 3 Others. In 1929 Labour increased their number by two, Conservative and Independent dropped by one each. The Liberals remained unchanged.

Ward results
* ='retiring' ward councillor for re-election
Percentage changes from 1925.

Adamsdown

Canton

Cathays

Central

Gabalfa

Grangetown

Llandaff

Penylan

Plasnewydd

Riverside

Roath

South

Splott

References

Cardiff
Council elections in Cardiff
1920s in Cardiff